Krasny Kholm is a rural locality (a village) in Zheleznodorozhnoye Rural Settlement, Sheksninsky District, Vologda Oblast, Russia. The population was 20 as of 2002.

Geography 
Krasny Kholm is located 20 km southwest of Sheksna (the district's administrative centre) by road. Chetverikovo is the nearest rural locality.

References 

Rural localities in Sheksninsky District